Landslake Lions is a Dutch basketball club based in Landsmeer, North Holland. The men's team currently plays in the Promotiedivisie, the second tier of basketball in the Netherlands. The women's team plays in the Vrouwen Basketball League, the Dutch first tier. The Lions play their game at the ICL Sportcenter, which has a capacity of 900 people.

Honours

Men
Promotiedivisie
Winners (1): 2016–17

Women
Vrouwen Basketball League
Winners (6): 2001, 2007, 2010, 2012, 2013, 2016

Notable players

Men's
 Berend Weijs
 Michael Madanly
 Nino Gorissen

References

External links
Official website
Official website first team

Basketball teams established in 1972
Basketball teams in the Netherlands